Jia County may refer to the following locations in mainland China:

Jia County, Henan
Jia County, Shaanxi